We Love You is the debut album by New York band Semi Precious Weapons. The album was originally released as a free download. However, when the group signed with Razor & Tie Records in 2008, they re-released the album under their new label. Several of the songs became live favourites, including the eponymous track and "Magnetic Baby". These songs, along with several other tracks from the record, were re-recorded with the band's new line-up for their follow up album entitled You Love You. The track "Semi Precious Weapons" was named "Brink of Fame Song" at the 2008 NewNowNext Awards.

Track listing

References

2008 debut albums
Semi Precious Weapons albums
Razor & Tie albums